José María Pino Suárez (1869–1913) was the seventh and last vice-president of Mexico. Things named after him include:

 Pino Suárez metro station, a Mexico City Metro station in downtown Mexico City
 Pino Suárez railway station, an under-construction train station in Toluca, State of Mexico
 Pino Suárez (Mexico City Metrobús), a BRT station in Mexico City
 Pino Suárez Sur (Mexico City Metrobús), a BRT station in Mexico City